Several ships of the Swedish Navy have been named HSwMS Uppland, named after Uppland province:

 , a ship of the line launched in 1689
 , a galley launched in 1748
 , a ship of the line launched in 1749 and lost in battle in 1790
 , a  launched in 1945 and decommissioned in 1979
 , a  launched in 1996

Swedish Navy ship names